Mga Anghel na Walang Langit (International title: Angels Without a Heaven) is a Philippine drama television series from May 9, 2005 to February 24, 2006, on ABS-CBN's Primetime Bida replacing Spirits and was replaced by Sa Piling Mo. It depicts the lives of exploited and unfortunate children and was inspired by the 1970 film "Mga Anghel na Walang Langit" produced and written by Fernando Poe Jr. under the pen name "Ronwaldo Reyes", which he used for the first time.

This series is currently streaming on Kapamilya Online Live Global every Tuesdays to Saturdays, 12:00am-2:00am Change Timeslot and was also replacing Ang Munting Paraiso & Princess Sarah on the following day (January 25).

Synopsis
A group of street children with different stories unite to survive the harsh conditions and harsher realities life applies to them.

Cast

Main
Nikki Bagaporo as Lorenza "Enchang" Bello – a girl with a blind mother Loleng, whom she loses after the police mistakenly accuse her of theft. Roams the streets with her friend Pepay in order to find her mother again. She is later adopted by the Sison family, and reunited with her biological father Albert.
Carl John Barrameda as Dodong – a boy from Bacolod who leaves behind his younger sister Anet to find work in order to take care of their sick mother. Was lured into Domeng’s syndicate after being offered food and he pretends to get mad at him, however. In the end, Dodong reconciles Domeng.
Miles Ocampo as Pepay – Enchang’s friend and Debra’s daughter. Leaves her mother due to the latter’s gambling problem, and to keep her younger siblings from being taken away. In the middle of episode, she was avoided by Debra by rejecting and now she reunites with her family.
Sharlene San Pedro as Gigi – Cresing’s daughter and Jeboy’s younger sister. Leaves with Jeboy due to their mother’s negligence, only to end up in Domeng’s syndicate after also being offered food. Later on gets separated from her brother and is taken to Lucing’s household.
John Manalo as Jeboy – Cresing’s son and Gigi’s older brother. Decides to leave with Gigi due to their mother’s negligence, only to end up in Domeng’s syndicate after also being offered food. Jeboy gets mad at Gigi because of Lucing and then at Cresing towards Father Vincent. Once again, he reconciles Gigi next to Cresing.

Supporting
Bella Flores† as Gaudencia "Gude" Redondo-Hawkins† – Domeng’s aunt. She died after surviving a heart attack.
Maricel Laxa as Dolores "Loleng" Bello† – Enchang’s blind mother and Albert’s first wife who can play guitar. After being released from jail due to a misunderstanding, she sets off to find Enchang.
Sylvia Sanchez as Marian Lopez† – One of the adults who help run the child syndicate. Uses her kind-hearted appeal to lure children into the syndicate. Previously had a relationship with Domeng. She becomes increasingly aggressive towards the children especially after Domeng decides to go against her and Greg for their abusive tactics. Later, she is a criminal and despises Harry for what happened to Dodong. During Domeng's sabotage with Harry all night Marian killed Buknoy after he dragged him and she gave many bruises when she met him again. She dies after she falls from the edge of the cliff by confessing at Domeng.
Johnny Delgado† as Domingo "Domeng" Redondo† - Former leader of a child syndicate who obtains Dodong, Jeboy, Gigi, Enchang and Pepay. He is initially harsh towards the children, but eventually becomes a father figure who cares for their health & well-being. Domeng despises Marian and Greg for abusing the children. Later revealed to be Dodong’s biological father but he denies this, making Dodong grow distant from him. He is finally reconciled by Dodong. During the party for all of his challenges, he was stabbed and shot by an unknown men while he and Dodong went to the store to buy some ice.
Willie Revillame as Wowowee host.
EJ Jallorina as Basilio "Buknoy" Quintos† – One of the children from Domeng’s syndicate. He later on lives with Dodong and Edison. Later, he left Domeng's house after he had a quarrel with Dodong about fake death of his father all night and he was taken by Harry to see Marian again and he has many bruises that she gave by killing.
Khaycee Alaboc as Karen – one of Pepay’s siblings. It is revealed she is adopted, and her biological mother is Congresswoman Agnes Francisco. 
Ryan Eigenmann as Alex† - Cresing’s womanizing ex-boyfriend. At the time of their relationship, Cresing chose Alex over her own children despite his abuse towards them. He was stabbed by himself after he got drunk.
Allen Dizon as Greg† – One of the adults who run the child syndicate led by Domeng. He is often seen drunk, and like Marian, he is also previously aggressive towards the children but he was beaten by Marian's brother Harry.
Alma Moreno as Deborah / Debra – Pepay’s mother who once had a gambling addiction. Because of this, her children run away from her. After winning the lottery, Debra is determined to find Pepay and her siblings and promises to give them all better lives. Now works as a performer in a local bar.
Ana Capri as Cresing – Jeboy and Gigi’s mother. She puts her boyfriend Alex first before her own children, causing them to leave her. In an attempt to turn her life around by opening her own salon, with the help of Debra, she reunites with her kids again. However this reunion is short-lived when she grows jealous of Gigi’s close relationship with Lucing and starts to see other men again, leading her to go insane once more until she gets better. She marries Father Vincent during the double wedding and she finally reconciles Gigi by not growing up her jealousy again.
Marissa Sanchez as Lucida "Lucing" Guzman-Rodriguez – A teacher and Gigi’s adoptive mother who is at first aggressive towards the child after having no choice but to take her in because of Marian. Teaches Gigi about manners and life skills and eventually warms up her. Marries Philip and they become a family together with Dorina and Gigi. Lucing marries Philip during the double wedding.
Nash Aguas as Allan† – Gigi’s neighbor and friend, who dies from an accident following an altercation between his father and maternal grandfather.
Eliza Pineda as Sydney – Pepay and Enchang's friend.
Lovely Rivero as Pilar – Lucing’s neighbor and Allan’s mother. Develops an attachment to Gigi after her son died, causing Lucing to move themselves away from her.
Eunice Lagusad as Anet – Dodong’s younger sister.
Marianne dela Riva as Alicia† – Dodong and Anet’s mother. Previously had a relationship with Domeng, resulting in Dodong.
Alfred Labatos as Pepot – One of the children from Domeng’s syndicate.
Mylene Dizon as Ira Mercado – a social worker who helps the children adjust at the orphanage, after retrieving them from Domeng’s household. When she realizes the kids love Domeng as their father figure, she drops the charges against him.
Isko Moreno as Fr. Vincent Julio – A priest who helps run the orphanage which houses the children from Domeng’s syndicate. Watches over Jeboy at the orphanage while Cresing is being treated at a psychiatric hospital.
Jiro Manio as Jasper Sison – Enchang’s foster brother who was jealous of her at first, but then learns to love her as his own sister after his mother's death. Jasper took care of Albert while he is on the wheelchair.
Ketchup Eusebio as Ted – Edison's friend.
Angelo Ilagan as Edison – A teenager who helps run Domeng’s child syndicate (both previously mistreated children, later took care of them and now despise Greg and Marian). He was saved by Domeng after his family died in a fire. After meeting Dorina, he is motivated to start school again. He lives with Buknoy and Dodong.
Erich Gonzales as Dorina Rodriguez – A girl in the neighbor who Edison has a crush on. Her father Philip, however, does not approve of their relationship.
Al Tantay as Philip Rodriguez – Dorina’s father who eventually starts a relationship with Lucing befoee their double wedding.
Rez Cortez as Batista†
Hyubs Azarcon as Enteng – Debra’s friend who supports her in the new chapter of her life after winning the lottery.
John Regala as Harieto “Harry” Lopez – Marian’s brother. He torments Dodong after he saved him from the hospital. Later, they both befriend each other and he also torments Greg and Father Vincent during New Year's Eve celebration as part of his evil plan. Harry decided to separate Dodong until he attempted to hostage. He died in a gunshot by the police officers and jumped off the bridge but he is alive to sabotage Domeng following his car accident and later Buknoy until he brought to Dodong with a lot of bruises from his sister. In the end, Harry forgives Dodong for what he had done to him and he was sent to the mental hospital.
Rannie Raymundo as Joe Sison – Jasper and Enchang's foster father.
Kookoo Gonzales as Beth Sison† – Jasper and Enchang's foster mother.
Patrick Dela Rosa as Albert Bello – Enchang’s biological father and Loleng’s ex-husband. It was said that he left Loleng to become an OFW in Saudi Arabia, but he actually pursued a career as a musician in a band. Has two sons with his new wife Tere. Becomes paralyzed from the waist down after getting into an accident. He was looking after by Joe, Jasper and Enchang but he grows hatred at them. Albert reconciles Enchang if he gets better.
Klaudia Koronel as Tere – Albert’s 2nd wife and Enchang’s step mother. She is aggressive towards Enchang for not having a stable music career that she can latch onto for money.
Angel Sy as Colette Padilla – Gigi's best friend.
Nathan Lopez as Nato† – Menggay's son and Dodong’s friend who joins a gang because he is deaf.
Chinggoy Alonzo† as Henry
Kiray as Pinky – Jeboy's friend from the streets. She stays at the shelter center to avoid her family’s problems, but eventually decides to go back home.
Irma Adlawan as Menggay – a woman who takes care of Dodong and guides him about socializing gangs while she works at the market with her son Nato.
Gloria Romero as Doña Elena – Debra’s mother and Pepay’s grandmother.
Cheska Iñigo as Cong. Agnes Francisco – a political official who decides to find her lost daughter, who is later revealed to be Pepay’s sister Karen.
Ana Roces as Mitch Olinarias – Vincent’s first wife.
Flora Gasser† as Maria
Karel Marquez as Jane
Efren Reyes Jr. as Mike Merandilla
Kristoffer Horace Neudeck as Jerome
Kim Atienza as Rolly Lopez
Sam Concepcion as Pepay's friend
Phoemela Barranda as TV-host
Jenny Miller as young Gude
Steven Fermo as Joshua
Adriana Agcaoili as Bridgette Padilla - Colette’s mother.

Production
The series was announced in March 2005 where a trailer for the show was produced, with production and principal photography for the series were done for 9 months from May 9, 2005 to February 24, 2006 between 2 seasons.

See also
List of programs broadcast by ABS-CBN
List of ABS-CBN drama series

References

External links

Television series by Dreamscape Entertainment Television
2005 Philippine television series debuts
2006 Philippine television series endings
2000s children's television series
ABS-CBN drama series
Filipino-language television shows
Television shows set in the Philippines